Orgel diagrams are correlation diagrams which show the relative energies of electronic terms in transition metal complexes, much like Tanabe–Sugano diagrams. They are named after their creator, Leslie Orgel. Orgel diagrams are restricted to only show weak field (i.e. high spin) cases, and offer no information about strong field (low spin) cases. Because Orgel diagrams are qualitative, no energy calculations can be performed from these diagrams; also, Orgel diagrams only show the symmetry states of the highest spin multiplicity instead of all possible terms, unlike a Tanabe–Sugano diagram. Orgel diagrams will, however, show the number of spin allowed transitions, along with their respective symmetry designations. In an Orgel diagram, the parent term (P, D, or F) in the presence of no ligand field is located in the center of the diagram, with the terms due to that electronic configuration in a ligand field at each side. There are two Orgel diagrams, one for d1, d4, d6, and d9 configurations and the other with d2, d3, d7, and d8 configurations.

In an Orgel diagram, lines with the same Russell–Saunders terms will diverge due to the non-crossing rule, but all other lines will be linear. Also, for the D Orgel diagram, the left side contains d1 and d6 tetrahedral and d4 and d9 octahedral complexes. The right side contains d4 and d9 tetrahedral and d1 and d6 octahedral complexes. For the F Orgel diagram, the left side contains d2 and d7 tetrahedral and d3 and d8 octahedral complexes. The right side contains d3 and d8 tetrahedral and d2 and high spin d7 octahedral complexes.

References

External links
 Applying Electronic Spectra
Calculations Using Orgel Diagrams
Calculations Using Tanabe-Sugano Diagrams
Spectroscopy of First Row Transition Metal Complexes – F Ground States

Coordination chemistry
Spectroscopy
Inorganic chemistry
Transition metals